Naked Violence is a 1969 Italian giallo film directed by Fernando Di Leo and based on the novel I ragazzi del massacro written by Giorgio Scerbanenco.

Plot 
In the evening school of Andrea and Maria, in Milan, a group of eleven, mostly street criminals between thirteen and twenty, brutally murders the teacher Matilde Crescenzaghi for no apparent reason. The police begin to investigate the murder, but finds no clear evidence or sufficient information to shed light on the mysterious affair. Pressed by the investigating judge who wants to close the case, but also seized by remorse and by his own conscience, the police-chief Luigi Càrrua entrusts the case to the Commissioner Lamberti, his friend and collaborator.

The latter begins to investigate, remaining overwhelmed by the brutality of the murder, and begins to assume that it was a personal vendetta. Lamberti insists on questioning the boys in his own way, with harsh and coercive methods. With the help of the agent Mascaranti and social worker Livia Hussar, Lamberti will soon come to the truth surrounding the murder.

Cast 

Pier Paolo Capponi: Commissioner Duca Lamberti
Susan Scott: Livia Ussaro
Enzo Liberti: quaestor Luigi Càrrua
Marzio Margine: Carolino Marassi
Michel Bardinet: Stelvio Sampero 
Danika La Loggia: Beatrice Romani

Production
Naked Violence was the first film that combined the work of author Giorgio Scerbanenco and director Fernando di Leo, which Italian film historian and critic Roberto Curti described as "extremely important within the Italian crime genre." Di Leo's film does not follow the book closely, with the director explaining that "there wasn't Scerbaneenco's Milan, because I wanted to express more: here's our boys, all our boys, here's what they are becoming, who we have in front of us[...]our crisis has become their crisis." Di Leo changed the characters and pruned the plot down to a minimum.

Naked Violence was shot at Elios Film in Rome.

Release
Naked Violence was distributed theatrically in Italy by Italian International Film on 26 December 1969. The film grossed a total of 251,512,000 Italian lire domestically. The film was released in the United Kingdom as The Boys Who Slaughter.

In 2004 it was restored and shown as part of the retrospective "Storia Segreta del Cinema Italiano: Italian Kings of the Bs" at the 61st Venice International Film Festival. The Film was released by Raro on DVD, which features the uncut Italian version of the film was shown at the Venice festival.

Notes

References

External links

1969 films
Italian crime films
1969 crime films
Films based on works by Giorgio Scerbanenco
Films directed by Fernando Di Leo
1960s Italian films